The Pantry 300 was a NASCAR Busch Series stock car race held at Hickory Motor Speedway, in Hickory, North Carolina. One of the inaugural events of the series from its 1982 season, it was one of five races at the track in 1982, four in 1983 to 1985, three in 1986 and, from 1987 to 1994, was the series' second annual visit to the track, following which only the spring Sundrop 400 remained on the schedule until Hickory Motor Speedway departed the series schedule after the 1998 season.  From 1982 to 1987, the second race was the Bobby Isaac Memorial race, which was an established Late Model race at Hickory;  that race switched to weekly NASCAR classification in 1988 and remains to this day. The race distance was 200 laps from 1982 to 1990, 276 laps in 1991, and 300 laps from 1992 to 1994. The race served as the series' season-ending event in 1992. Jack Ingram and Tommy Houston were the only multiple winners of the event, each winning twice; the final The Pantry 300 was won by Dennis Setzer, who in doing so became the first rookie in series history to win twice in his rookie season.

Past winners

References

External links
 

Former NASCAR races
NASCAR Xfinity Series races
NASCAR races at Hickory Motor Speedway